Beijing BISS International School (BISS) is an independent co-educational English-language day school located in Chaoyang District, Beijing, People's Republic of China.

Founded in 1994, educates kindergarten through grade 12 students from Beijing's expatriate community through all three International Baccalaureate (IB) programs: the Primary Years Programme, the Middle Years Programme, and the Diploma Programme. The school has 340 students from 40 different nationalities as of 2012.

History
Beijing BISS International School was founded in 1994 by its sister school, the International School Singapore (ISS), as an independent proprietary, co-educational, English-language day school offering an international curriculum to students from Kindergarten to grade 12 from Beijing's expatriate community. BISS was the first International School licensed by The Beijing Educational Commission, and the first school in Beijing to offer all three IB programs.

In 2018 the school temporary closed for two days, citing financial issues. In response to ongoing non-payment of staff salaries and entitlements BISS teachers went on strike on September 20, 2018. Some current and former staff were owed as much as 120,000 yuan. Teachers wrote parents a letter stating that "Faculty contracts have not been honored and wages, health insurance. and housing allowances have not been paid".

Program

Curriculum
 BISS offers the Primary Years Programme (PYP), Middle Years Programme (MYP) and Diploma Programme (DP)  to all students, from kindergarten through grade 12.

Accreditations, Authorizations, Memberships and Licences
Authorized by the International Baccalaureate (IB): BISS was the first school in Beijing and one of the first in China to be authorized to offer all three IB programs
Accredited by the National Centre for School Curriculum and Textbook Development (NCCT)
Licensed by the Beijing Education Commission
Member of the Association of China and Mongolia International Schools
Member of the East Asia Regional Council of Schools

Students
BISS provides instruction for kindergarten to grade 12 students from the expatriate community of Beijing. As of 2012, 340 students from 40 different nationalities attend the school.

Class sizes
BISS maintains a relatively low student to teacher class ratios, with classes typically having 15 students or less to 1 teacher. Luo Wangshu of the Shanghai Daily reported that "BISS believes that smaller class sizes make for better academic performance and communication."

Faculty
BISS faculty members hail from the United States, Canada, Australia, Korea, New Zealand, Singapore, China, Japan, the Philippines, Portugal, and the U.K. In 2017, Search Associates, the most reputable international schools' recruitment agency disassociated itself from BISS because of unpaid fees. As a result, BISS now recruits most of its faculty through its website.

Tuition
As of 2009 the school tuition ranges from lower for kindergarteners to higher for older students. Kindergarteners each had a tuition of 96,000 yuan (49,217 Malaysian ringgits) while a high school senior had a tuition of 172,000 yuan (RM88,181). For kindergarten and first grade classes, as of 2012 the school charged up to 109,800 yuan yearly per pupil. In 2015 the tuition for the year was 300,000 renminbi ($48,330 U.S. dollars). China Daily ranked BISS as the most expensive private school in Beijing.

References

Further reading
 "北京BISS国际学校师生到大堡学区开展实践交流活动." Zhuolu County Communist Youth League (涿鹿县共青团) Zhulu County Group Council (逐鹿县团委) Zhuolu County Group Council (涿鹿县团委) 2011-10-17 14:06:27. (Archive)

External links

Beijing BISS International School

Schools in Chaoyang District, Beijing
International schools in Beijing
Educational institutions established in 1994
International Baccalaureate schools in China
Association of China and Mongolia International Schools
1994 establishments in China
High schools in Beijing